Rubbadubbers is a British stop-motion children's television series produced by HIT Entertainment and Hot Animation from 15 January 2003 to 3 November 2005, aired on BBC2 in the UK. Created by Peter Curtis, it focuses on seven friendly tub toys as they tell stories, while coming to life (the leader in the show was a pink frog named Tubb). Hasbro licensed it to produce a toy line for the series. In the US, the series was broadcast on Nickelodeon, on Noggin and on PBS Kids Sprout.

The series was originally announced under the working title "Plugg" (an early name for the character of Tubb). BBC started commissioning the show in 2002 after two pilots were made: "Plugg" from 1999 and "Splish Splash Splosh!" from 2001.

Overview
Seven anthropomorphic, friendly British bath toys called the Rubbadubbers live a peaceful life in the bathroom of a house in the fictional Bathsville City. The toys belong to two children who live at the house named Benjie and Sis (however, they are never ever seen on-screen, not even their shadows). Whenever the children or anyone else are not present, the Rubbadubbers come to life and begin a fun activity.

But in every episode, one of the toys become dissatisfied with the way the activity or situation goes. He/she then wishes for it to go as planned by beginning the wish with 'if only...' . Suddenly, the Rubbadubber begins dreaming about an alternate reality where the wish comes true. Some of the other Rubbadubbers appear in the dream world as well, where they play different versions of their regular selves in order to either assist or hinder the character that made the wish.

It always turns out that the wish goes wrong in the dream world, much to the character's disappointment. The character then complains again with another 'if only...', wish which automatically stops the dream. From the dream, the character itself learns to be careful with what they wish for, and then decides that instead of changing the real-world situation to their will, they should simply leave it as it was and find a way to have fun with it. All the Rubbadubbers are then happy again. Every episode ends with Reg the robot, one of the Rubbadubbers, announcing to the others that Benjie and Sis are arriving for their bath. The toys then excitedly prepare themselves for it.

Characters

Rubbadubbers 

Tubb the Frog (voiced by John Gordon Sinclair) is a male Scottish rubber frog and the leader of the Rubbadubbers. He is admired by everyone for his cool attitude and enjoys cleaning anything with his cotton bud and floating on a green lily pad. Tubb's catchphrase is 'swimmin'!'
Sploshy the Starfish (voiced by Maria Darling) is the Rubbadubbers' mischief-maker. She has suction cups behind every one of her 5 arms, speaks with a childish English accent, is energetic (she is often seen cartwheeling) and is known to have a hot and short temper. Sploshy's catchphrase is "Splish, Splash, Splosh!"
Finbar the Mighty Shark (voiced by Sean Hughes) is the bathroom's mischief-maker. He often calls himself in third-person 'the mighty, scary shark', while often playing games involving pretend hunting and scaring. He also frequently uses the word 'mighty' in place of 'very' to describe things. In the dream worlds, he usually plays roles that rival the character that made the wish (such as robbers, monsters and even his regular self). Finbar's pirate-like catchphrase is 'arr, arr, arr!' (one which he uses countless times).
Terence the Bubble-Bath Crocodile (voiced by John Gordon Sinclair) is Amelia's closest friend who can blow bubbles through his nostrils and dislikes getting splashed, often avoiding liquid water altogether. He has a favourite, red toothbrush for cleaning his one tooth. Terence also has several spots on his back and doesn't have a catchphrase.
Winona the Whale (vocal effects performed by Maria Darling) is the only Rubbadubber who cannot at all make "If Only" wishes, but she can still make squeaking sounds in order to communicate with the other Rubbadubbers. She can also squirt water from her small blowhole and perform tail tricks in the bath water.
Reg the Robot (voiced by John Gordon Sinclair) is the supporting leader of the Rubbadubbers who speaks with a distinctive stammer. Just like Terence, he avoids water, as simply getting splashed makes him "short circuit". He also stutters rather often. He plays with the others but is always on the lookout for Benjie and Sis' presence in order to make the Rubbadubbers prepare themselves for bath time. At the end of every episode, he announces their arrival with his catchphrase: 'Rubbadubbers! Rubbadubbers! Benjie and Sis/the children are coming! Bath time scramble!'
Amelia the Submarine (voiced by Maria Darling) is the bathroom's first mate who has the nose of a clown. Likely named after Amelia Earhart, she and the Rubbadubbers often call her 'the flying submarine'. She is very energetic (like Sploshy), is usually feeling happy and loves to try new things, fly around the bathroom and perform tricks.

Others 
Lawrence (voiced by John Gordon Sinclair) is a male English soap bottle that resembles a crocodile. He only appears in the episode "Terence's Double Trouble" and plays Terence's almost-fully-identical friend in Terence's dream. But the only differences to him and Terence are that the tie that he wears is blue (Terence always has a red one), he doesn't have a toothbrush, he has two teeth (Terence has only one) and can do better tie tricks than Terence.
Benjie and Sis are the two young owners of the Rubbadubbers that are never seen on-screen. They are two human siblings that are presumably British. Whenever they need to use the bathroom, Reg the robot alerts the Rubbadubbers to prepare for their arrival.

Episodes

Series 1 (2002)
 "Tubb the Pirate" – After getting scared by a pirate's hat, Tubb wishes to become a pirate so he can never be scared. In his dream, he becomes the captain of a pirate ship. However, when he and his crew arrive on an island, they are shooed off by two pirates called Rusty Reg and Terrible Terence. When they begin to shoot cannonballs at them, they have to rely on bravery to save themselves.
 "Terence's Double Trouble" – Terence wishes to have a friend just like him after the Rubbadubbers do not want to play with him. In his dream, he meets Lawrence, a character who looks and acts the same as him. They instantly become friends, but when Lawrence starts to impress the Rubbadubbers with his tricks, Terence has to get his friends’ attention back. But how?
 "Reg the Monster" – Reg wants to finish his jigsaw puzzle in peace, so he becomes the "Leave Me Alone Monster".
 "Sploshy's Tail" – Sploshy wants to do tail tricks like Winona, so she gets herself a weird-shaped tail.
 "Tubb the Magician" – Tubb sees Benjie's magic wand and wants to make things disappear for good, but it never works. Wishing that he was a magician, Tubb becomes just that in his dream. When he accidentally makes all his friends disappear, including Terence, he doesn't know how to get them back again. Luckily, Witch Sploshy saves the day after Tubb gives her the wand.
 "Deep Sea Reg" – Reg wishes he could have fun in the water with the others without malfunctioning, so in his dream, he is tasked with guarding the royal treasure of King Tubb and Queen Sploshy of the deep ocean. When they leave, Reg accidentally lets in Finbar the thief and allows him to steal the treasure. When he gets away, Reg has to chase him down before it's too late.
 "Scary Finbar" – After Finbar fails to scare any of his six friends, he wishes that he could scare them for real. When he dreams of becoming an even scarier version of himself, the others are just too scared to be with him, much to his disappointment.
 "Train Driver Tubb" – When the Rubbadubbers find Benjie and Sis’ homemade model train lying about on the bathroom floor, they begin playing on it, with everyone playing a different role. But Tubb starts to do everything himself, which upsets the others. Wishing he was allowed to do so, in his dream, Tubb becomes the driver of a train carrying passengers and real gold in the safe. When the Mighty Train Robbers hijack the train, however, they take Tubb and his passengers as prisoners and tie them up, but when the speed lever breaks and the train goes full speed, Tubb has to stop the train from derailing.
 "Sploshy of the Arctic" – Sploshy transports herself to the Arctic after not wanting to cool off on a hot day.
 "Sploshybird" – After disrupting the Rubbadubbers' quiet time, Sploshy becomes a make-believe bird who makes noise when she moves.
 "Terence Of Arabia" – After being splashed, Terence transports himself to a desert, where is not much water.
 "Speedy Terence" – After losing a race thanks to being distracted, Terence wants to be fast.
 "Amelia the Babysitter" – Amelia wants to be in charge, all because she does not want to be told what to do. After babysitting the other Rubbadubbers in a cloud world, she learns that being in charge is too much responsibility.

Series 2 (2003)
 "Princess Amelia" – After bumping her nose, Amelia becomes a princess, with her servants, Tubb and Finbar, worrying about her and not ever letting her out of her bedroom.
 "Rocket Sled Reg" – Reg wishes himself into having a faster sledge, but the sledge soon goes out of control in a crazy race.
 "Terence the Shop Keeper" – Terence is being possessive of the new bubble bath and soap bottles in the bathroom.
 "Tubb the Frog Prince" – After Tubb sees his friends read a fairy tale book, Tubb becomes a frog prince himself.
 "Amelia and the Detectives" – Amelia needs a detective to help her find her missing sponge.
 "Footballer Tubb" – Tubb hates losing football games, so he wishes that he can win all the time.
 "Finbar the Star" – Finbar becomes a movie star to get out of tidying up the bathroom.
 "Spaceman Reg" – Reg wants to go to the moon after not knowing about it.
 "Doctor Terence" – Terence becomes a doctor to cheer his friends up and make them better.
 "Super Amelia" – After Amelia and Finbar try to outdo each other, Amelia wishes herself into superhero training.
 "Sploshy the Stoneseeker" – Sploshy wants to collect stones after not sharing any with her friends.
 "Sheriff Terence" – Terence makes his own rules but runs into trouble when his own rules get the better of him.
 "Tubb's Cake Mistake" – Tubb dislikes the fake cake at a tea party, so he is transported to a cake shop to try real cake.

Series 3 (2004)
 "Finbar's Rescuers" – Finbar does not want to be a rescuer in the Sponge Rescues, so he wants to be rescued instead.
 "Finbar and the Green Hat Gang" – Finbar sets certain requirements for anyone who wants to be in his gang.
 "Terence the Spy" – Terence wants to find out what his friends are planning for him.
 "Terence's Bubble Trouble" – Terence does not want to run out of bubbles, so he wishes that everything he touches turns into bubbles.
 "Finbar's Important Part" – Finbar wants to join a band, but all the instruments are taken.
 "Copy Sploshy" – Sploshy wants everyone to copy her dance exactly, instead of adding their own moves.
 "Reg's Game Plan" – Reg does not have any new games in his memory banks, so he transports himself to Game Land.
 "Farmer Sploshy" – Sploshy wants to live on a farm and drive around on a tractor all day, but she ends up neglecting all of her duties.
 "Little Red Riding Tubb" – Tubb plays all the roles in a Little Red Riding Hood play.
 "Silly Sploshy" – Sploshy is in a silly mood, and wants all the other Rubbadubbers to clown around with her while they are playing with blocks.
 "Terence's Ties" – Terence wants new ties after seeing Benjie and Sis's new school uniforms.
 "Reg in Squareworld" – After Reg cannot draw a sun properly, he gets transported to a square world, where circles are illegal.
 "Amelia the Diver" – Amelia has to dive to bring up Captain Terence's ship, the Jolly Bubble, from under the sea.

Series 4 (2005)
 "Finbar's Gift" – When the Rubbadubbers give each other Christmas gifts, Finbar wishes that he has all the presents on Finbar Day.
 "Finbar and the Ghosts" – After Finbar is unable to scare his friends with a scary story, he transports himself to a school of ghosts.
 "Sploshy's Wishes" – After Sploshy's wish on a shooting star does not come true, she wants her own genie to give her wishes.
 "Sporty Reg" – After not winning the bathroom games, Reg wishes himself into Sports World to find out his real strengths.
 "The House That Tubb Built" – Tubb wants to build a house his way instead of following directions.
 "Terence the Monster Hunter" – When Terence sees Finbar dress up like a monster in the bathroom, he wishes that everyone believed him.
 "Reg and the Library" –  Reg wants to read in peace, so he is transported to a library.
 "Tufty Tubb" – Tubb wants to grow hair and styles it for a competition.
 "Lighthouse Keeper Reg" – Reg does not want to take a break from keeping watch for Benjie and Sis, so he gets transported to his own lighthouse.
 "Tubb's Towers" – Tubb wants more rooms after trying and failing to read a letter from Benjie and Sis' grandmother in peace.
 "Messenger Terence" – Terence wants to be first with the news, so he becomes a 1400s explorer delivering news to a village.
 "Sky Painter Amelia" – Amelia wants to make pictures like her friends, but she cannot hold her paintbrush right.
 "Finbar the Word Shark" – Finbar keeps losing a word game, so he wants to know all the words.

Shorts
These shorts were never seen on television in the United Kingdom, but six of them were released on DVDs.

 "Row, Row, Row"
 "Steamy Mirror"
 "On A Roll"
 "Swimming Races"
 "Hide And Seek"
 "Great Skate"
 "Swimmin'!"
 "Drip"
 "Being Choosey"
 "All Wrapped Up"
 "Something Sticky"
 "Having A Ball"
 "Can You Remember?"
 "Floaty Feather"
 "Clean and Groovy"

VHS and DVD Releases

United Kingdom
HIT Entertainment released three DVD and VHS releases of the series. "Here Come the Rubbadubbers" was released on May 12, 2003. "Splish! Splash! Splosh!" was released on September 1, 2003, and "Bathtime Scramble" was released on February 23, 2004. Each release contains four episodes, with the first two releases also containing some of the shorts. The three DVDs were reissued as part of a boxset on March 12, 2007, while an additional release - "Swimmin'", was released as a Carry Case DVD on April 9, 2007.

United States
HIT Entertainment released four DVD and VHS releases of the series, titled "Here Come the Rubbadubbers", "Tubb's Pirate Treasure", "High Noon in the Bathroom", and "Finbar, the Mighty Movie Star", released on January 27, March 16, July 13 and October 12 of 2004, respectively. Each release contained five episodes.

References

External links

 

2000s British animated television series
2000s British children's television series
2000s preschool education television series
2003 British television series debuts
2005 British television series endings
Animated preschool education television series
BBC children's television shows
British children's animated fantasy television series
British preschool education television series
British stop-motion animated television series
Nickelodeon original programming
Nick Jr. original programming
Television series by Mattel Creations
Treehouse TV original programming
CBeebies